Jasienica is a district of Police, Poland, a town in the Pomerania Region. In the High and Late Middle Ages, the village was the site of Jasenitz Abbey, now in ruins.

Gunica River and a kayak-way
In Jasienica there is a confluence of the Gunica - a small river used as a kayak-way from Węgornik through Tanowo, Tatynia and Wieńkowo. Gunica flows into Oder in the north part of the town of Police.

Jasienica Abbey
An Augustinian abbey existed from the 14th century until its dissolution during the Protestant Reformation, when the abbeys of the Duchy of Pomerania were turned into secular domains of the local dukes. The buildings are now in ruins. Each year at the end of August there is Augustinian Fair (Polish: Jarmark Augustiański) organized in the area of ruins of the abbey, with parade residents of the estate in historical costumes, lectures, artistic performances and stalls with traditional products.

Notable residents
 Hans Modrow (1928–2023), politician

Infrastructure
Roads:
from the centre of Police to Trzebież and Nowe Warpno No. 114
to Tanowo, over Tatynia
Main streets in a district:
ul. Jasienicka
ul. Dworcowa
ul. Piastów
Szczecin - Police - Trzebież Railway
Public transport:
 bus lines 101 (to the Old Town of Police and a centre of Szczecin), 103 (to the Old Town and the New Town of Police and Trzeszczyn, Tanowo, Pilchowo and Szczecin-Głębokie), and 111 (to the Old Town and the New Town of Police)
LS "linia samorządowa" (different type of ticket) Police - Trzebież

See also
Police, West Pomeranian Voivodeship
Jasienica (disambiguation)

Police, West Pomeranian Voivodeship